Chemistry: An Asian Journal is a peer-reviewed scientific journal that publishes articles on all areas of chemistry and related fields. It is published by Wiley-VCH on behalf of the Asian Chemical Editorial Society.

Abstracting and indexing
The journal is indexed and abstracted in the following bibliographic databases:

According to the Journal Citation Reports, the journal has a 2020 impact factor of 4.568, ranking it 60th out of 178 in the category Multidisciplinary Chemistry.

References

External links 
 

Chemistry journals
Wiley-VCH academic journals
English-language journals
Biweekly journals
Publications established in 2006